Yaiselle Tous Tejada (born 22 August 1996) is a Colombian model, psychologist and beauty pageant titleholder who participated in Señorita Colombia 2018, where she won the title of Tercera Princesa (4thrunner up). She represented Colombia at Miss Supranational 2019 and placed Top 10.

Early life 
Yaiselle Tous was born on August 22, 1996, in Cartagena de Indias, Bolívar. She completed her high school at Corporación Educativa La Concepción. She later graduated with a degree in psychologist at the Universidad Tecnológica de Bolívar in Cartagena. In addition to Spanish, she is fluent in English.

Pageantry

Señorita Atlántico  2018-2019 
Tous competed for the title Señorita Cartagena in her regional, being the winner.

Señorita Colombia 2018-2019 
On November 12, 2018, the final of Señorita Colombia was held in the city of Cartagena de Indias, where Yaiselle Tous achieved the title of Tercera Princesa, with Gabriela Tafur being the winner of the contest.

Miss Supranational 2019 
Later, in June 2019, she was officially designated as Miss Colombia Supranational to represent the nation in the Miss Supranational 2019 beauty pageant to be held in December of that same year.

On December 6, 2019,  at the International Congress Centre in Katowice, Poland, Where candidates from 77 countries competed for the title. At the end of the event, Tous concluded her Miss Supranational journey by finishing as a Top 10 semifinalist.

References

External links 

 

Living people
1996 births
Colombian beauty pageant winners
Colombian female models